Alf Tommy Håkan Svensson (born 20 January 1970) is a Swedish former professional footballer who played as a goalkeeper.

He is best remembered for representing Halmstads BK between 1990 and 2002, with which he won two Allsvenskan titles as well as the 1994–95 Svenska Cupen. He also represented AIK, Paralimni FC, IF Elfsborg, BK Häcken, and Malmö FF during a career that spanned between 1990 and 2006.

A full international between 1998 and 2001, he won three caps for the Sweden national team. He also represented the Sweden Olympic team at the 1992 Summer Olympics.

Club career
Svensson represented Halmstads BK between 1990–2002, winning Allsvenskan twice in 1997 and 2000 and the 1994–95 Svenska Cupen. In 2003 he moved to rival team AIK claiming he wanted to win titles. This failed and his contract was ended in 2004 after some disagreements with the club. In early 2005 he signed a six-month contract with Paralimni FC from Cyprus, later in 2005 he returned to Sweden as a back-up goalkeeper for IF Elfsborg. He also represented BK Häcken and Malmö FF in 2006. He retired as a player at the end of Allsvenskan in 2007.

International career
Svensson represented the Sweden U21 team at the 1992 UEFA European Under-21 Championship, as well as the Sweden Olympic team at the 1992 Summer Olympics where he served as a back-up goalkeeper for Jan Ekholm.

He made his full international debut for Sweden on 29 January 1998, keeping a clean sheet in a friendly 2–0 win against Jamaica. He won his third and last cap on 31 January 2001 in a friendly 0–0 draw with the Faroe Islands.

Coaching career 
In late 2007 he signed a contract as assistant manager for Falkenbergs FF in Superettan.

Personal life
He is the father of Rosenborg player Rasmus Wiedesheim-Paul.

Honours
Halmstads BK
 Allsvenskan: 1997, 2000
 Svenska Cupen: 1994–95

Individual
 Swedish goalkeeper of the year: 2000
 Longest time without conceding a goal in Allsvenskan: 808 minutes

References

External links
 Dare! say no to drugs and violence, profile 

1970 births
Living people
Swedish footballers
Sweden international footballers
Olympic footballers of Sweden
Footballers at the 1992 Summer Olympics
Association football goalkeepers
Allsvenskan players
Cypriot First Division players
Halmstads BK players
AIK Fotboll players
BK Häcken players
Malmö FF players
IF Elfsborg players
Enosis Neon Paralimni FC players
Halmstads BK non-playing staff
Swedish expatriate footballers
Swedish expatriate sportspeople in Cyprus
Expatriate footballers in Cyprus
Sportspeople from Halmstad
Sportspeople from Halland County